Rao Sahib Vellore Iyyasamy Munuswamy Pillai (23 February 1889 – 14 December 1953) also spelled as Munisami Pillai, was an Indian businessman, politician, Scheduled Caste activist and activist of the Indian independence movement who served as the Minister for Agriculture and Rural Development in the government of C. Rajagopalachari from 1937 to 1939.

Early life 
Munuswamy Pillai was born in a poor(Inter caste married) family in Ootacamund, Nilgiris district in 1889. Due to his adverse financial circumstances, Munuswamy Pillai could afford little formal education and was forced to take up a job as a clerk at the age of twenty. After a successful stint as a clerk, Munuswamy Pillai set up his own business in 1925.

Public life 
Munuswamy Pillai was nominated to the Madras Legislative Council in 1926 representing the depressed classes. Under the presidentship of V. I. Munusamy Pillai 'The All India DC Congress' (2nd Conference) was held at Nagpur in May 1932. He supported the policies of the Indian National Congress and served as Minister of Agriculture and Rural Development in Rajaji's cabinet from 1937 to 1939.

Later life 
Munuswamy Pillai retired from public life following the resignation of the Congress ministry in 1939. He returned to politics and was later elected to the Indian Constituent Assembly from Madras in 1946. In the Constituent Assembly of India on 22 July 1947 for the adoption of the National Flag he said, "It is not to be the Flag of the rich or the wealthy but it is to be the Flag of the depressed, oppressed and submerged classes all over our country." He contested and lost the 1952 parliamentary elections from Tindivanam as an Indian National Congress candidate. He died on 14 December 1953 at the 63. A special resolution was passed by the Madras Legislative Assembly condoling his death.

Notes 

1889 births
1953 deaths
People from Ooty
20th-century Indian businesspeople
Businesspeople from Tamil Nadu
Tamil Nadu politicians
Indian independence activists from Tamil Nadu